Jason Chute (born 12 November 1971) is a Fijian former swimmer. He competed in three events at the 1988 Summer Olympics.

References

External links

1971 births
Living people
Fijian male swimmers
Olympic swimmers of Fiji
Swimmers at the 1988 Summer Olympics
Place of birth missing (living people)
20th-century Fijian people
21st-century Fijian people